The 2007 MTV Video Music Brazil was hosted by Daniela Cicarelli and took place at the Credicard Hall. In 2007, the awards have faced a major rebranding, with several categories extinguished (most notably the specific genre divisions), and the awards in general no longer awarded the best videos (with the exception of the Video of the Year category); instead, the awards were generally focused on the artists, similarly to the MTV Europe Music Awards.

Nominations
winners are in bold text.

Act of the Year
 Cachorro Grande
 Capital Inicial
 Charlie Brown Jr.
 CPM 22
 Marcelo D2
 Jota Quest
 Lobão
NX Zero
 Pitty
 Skank

Video of the Year
 Autoramas — "Mundo Moderno"
 Cachorro Grande — "Você Me Faz Continuar"
 Cansei de Ser Sexy — "Alala vr2"
 Charlie Brown Jr. — "Não Viva em Vão"
 Ira! — "Eu Vou Tentar"
 Mukeka Di Rato — "Rinha de Magnata"
 MV Bill — "Língua De Tamanduá"
Pitty — "Na Sua Estante"
 Sandrão — "Respeito Oriental"
 Skank — "Seus Passos"

Hit of the Year
NX Zero — "Razões e Emoções"
 Capital Inicial — "Eu Nunca Disse Adeus"
 CPM 22 — "Além De Nós"
 Natiruts — "Natiruts Reggae Power"
 Pitty — "Na Sua Estante"

Best New Act
 Bonde do Rolê
Fresno
 Céu
 Mariana Aydar
 Moptop

Best International Act
 Amy Winehouse
 Arctic Monkeys
 Fall Out Boy
 Fergie
 Justin Timberlake
 Lily Allen
 My Chemical Romance
 Panic! at the Disco
Red Hot Chili Peppers
 White Stripes

MTV Bet
 Cueio Limão
 Pública
Strike
 Vanguart
 Zefirina Bomba

Best Live Act
Cachorro Grande
 Los Hermanos
 Mutantes
 Nação Zumbi
 Nando Reis e os Infernais

Web Hit of the Year
 "As Árvores Somos Nozes"
 Confissões de um Emo
 "Funk da Menina Pastora"
 Suplicy canta Racionais
 "Vai tomar no..."

Video You Made
 Gabriel Alves — "Na Sua Estante"

Dream Band
 Vocals: Pitty (Pitty)
 Guitar: Fabrizio Martinelli (Hateen)
 Bass: Champignon (Revolucionnários)
 Drums: Japinha (CPM 22)

Performances
 Juliette and the Licks — "Hot Kiss"
 Sandy & Junior (featuring Lucas Silveira and Marcelo Gross) — "Abri Os Olhos"
 Pitty — "Pulsos"
 Sandrão (featuring DJ Cia) — "Respeito Oriental"
 2007 VMB Dream Band winners — "Ainda É Cedo"
 Lobão — "Rádio Blá"
 Marilyn Manson — "Putting Holes in Happiness"/"The Dope Show"
 NX Zero — "Razões e Emoções"/"Além De Mim"

MTV Video Music Brazil